The electoral district of Kentish was a single-member electoral district of the Tasmanian House of Assembly. It centred on the town of Sheffield in Tasmania's north, inland from Devonport.

The seat was created in a redistribution ahead of the 1903 state election from the southern part of West Devon and smaller parts of Devonport, and was abolished when the Tasmanian parliament adopted the Hare-Clark electoral model in 1909. It had a single member during its existence, John Hope, who had previously represented the seat of Devonport and went on to represent the new Wilmot division.

Members for Kentish

References
 
 
 Parliament of Tasmania (2006). The Parliament of Tasmania from 1956

Kentish